City Cruises is a cruise vessel operator in England with operations in London, Poole and York. It is a subsidiary of Hornblower Cruises.

History
City Cruises was incorporated in 1986. In the late 1980s the company acquired former Gosport Ferry boats Vita and Ferry Queen, since sold. In 1990 it also acquired many small ex Thompson Launches boats. It had been realised since the 1980s that purpose-built boats were needed for operating sightseeing cruises on the River Thames in London but it was not until 1996, following changes to service licensing legislation, that the company's first purpose-built boat, the Millennium of London, was launched followed in 1999 by four new RiverLiners; Millennium City, Millennium Dawn, Millennium of Peace and Millennium Time. Breaking with a river tradition the boats were painted red during the 1990s but this was changed to the current red and white livery with the advent of the RiverLiners. These new boats provided the service to/from Waterloo (London Eye), Blackfriars and the Queen Elizabeth II Pier (Millennium Dome) throughout the year 2000. These same boats transferred to the new Westminster - Tower - Greenwich service from 1 January 2001. City Cruises is now the largest river sightseeing company on the River Thames.

In 2002 City Cruises acquired sole ownership of The Yardarm Club Limited, incorporated in 1962, which owns and operates the Restaurant Ship Hispaniola permanently moored alongside Victoria Embankment in central London.

In April 2014, City Cruises began operations in Poole with cruises along the Jurassic Coast and around Brownsea Island with the boats Solent Scene and Island Scene.

In 2017, City Cruises purchased the YorkBoat company in York and renamed it City Cruises York.

In October 2019, City Cruises was acquired by Hornblower Cruises.

References

External links
 
 

London River Services
Transport companies established in 1986
Transport operators in London
1986 establishments in England